The women's 10 kilometre pursuit at the 2017 Asian Winter Games was held on February 24, 2017 at the Nishioka Biathlon Stadium.

Schedule
All times are Japan Standard Time (UTC+09:00)

Results

References

Results

External links
Official website

Women pursuit